Hauser is a German-language surname. Notable people with the surname include:

 Arnold George Hauser (1888–1966), American baseball player
 Arnold Hauser (art historian) (1892–1978), Hungarian art historian
 Bodo Hauser (1946–2004), German journalist and writer
 Cole Hauser (born 1975), American actor
 Dwight Hauser (1911–1969), screenwriter, actor, and producer; father of Wings
 Eduard Hauser (cross-country skier) (b. 1948), Swiss cross-country skier
 Eduard Hauser (general) (1895–1961), Generalleutnant in the Wehrmacht during World War II
Emily Hauser (born 1987 or 1988), British classicist and novelist
 Erich Hauser (1930–2004), German sculptor
 Friedrich Hauser (1859–1917), German classical archaeologist and art historian
 Gayelord Hauser (1895–1984), German-American nutritionist and author
 Henri Hauser (1866–1946), Algerian-born French historian
 Hermann Hauser (born 1948), Austrian entrepreneur and cofounder of Acorn Computers
 Hermann Hauser Sr. (1882–1952), German luthier
 Joey Hauser (born 1999), American basketball player
 Julius Hauser (1854–1920), NYS Treasurer 1907-1908
 Kaspar Hauser (1812–1833), German foundling
 Lisa Theresa Hauser (born 1993), Austrian biathlete
 Marc Hauser (born 1959), American ethologist found guilty of scientific misconduct
 Otto Hauser (1874–1932), Swiss pre-historian
 Philip Hauser, demographer
 Sam Hauser (born 1997), American basketball player; brother of Joey
 Samuel Thomas Hauser (1833–1914), American politician from Montana
 Stjepan Hauser (born 1986), Croatian cellist
 Tim Hauser (1941–2014), singer and co-founder of vocal group The Manhattan Transfer
 Walter Hauser (1837–1902), Swiss politician
 Wings Hauser (born 1947), American actor, director, and screenwriter
 Zvi Hauser, Israeli politician

See also 
 Houser (disambiguation)
 Hauser, Idaho, in the United States
 Hauser, Oregon, in the United States

German-language surnames